The chairperson of the State Bank of India is the chief executive officer of India's largest scheduled commercial bank and the ex-officio chair of its Central Board of Directors. Since its establishment in 1955 by the government of India, the SBI has been headed by twenty-sixchairpersons.

The term of office typically runs for three years and can, in some cases, be extended for another two years. However, in practice, only two chairpersons, Raj Kumar Talwar and Arundhati Bhattacharya, had their terms extended. Arundhati Bhattacharya was also the first female chairperson of the bank and continues to be the only woman to have held that post

The inaugural officeholder was the Indian railway minister John Matthai, while Raj Kumar Talwar holds the unique distinction of having been in office for the longest time. P. C. Bhattacharya also held the post of governor of Reserve Bank of India.

Although the State Bank of India, through its predecessors, the Imperial Bank of India and others, has existed in some form since 1806, this article strives to list only those chairmen who have headed the bank since its formation in its modern form, that is since 1955.

Dinesh Kumar Khara is the current chairman of the State Bank of India since 7 October 2020.

SBI chairpersons list

References

External links
 
 
 

Lists of office-holders in India
State Bank of India
Lists of chairmen
Chairpersons of corporations by company